Honey Ohs! (previously Oh's!, Ohs, or Honey Graham Ohs) is a breakfast cereal made by Post Cereals, but originally introduced by the Quaker Oats Company. 

The original Oh's! cereal was introduced in 1980 by the Quaker Oats Co. It originally came in two varieties: "Crunchy Graham" and "Honey Nut". In 1988, they were renamed "Honey Graham" and "Crunchy Nut." Eventually, Crunchy Nut was discontinued and only Honey Graham was available.

In 1989, Quaker went on to introduce a variety of flavors, including "Apple Cinnamon Ohs", "Apple Ohs", and "Fruitangy Ohs".

As of August 2014, the brand was sold to Post Foods.

In early 2018, Post reformulated the cereal as "Honey Oh's" along with a box redesign. The new formulation no longer contains graham flour, coconut oil, brown sugar, oats and other original ingredients.

References

External links
 

Quaker Oats Company cereals
Products introduced in 1988